Leichhardt Bus Depot is a bus depot in the Sydney suburb of Leichhardt operated by Transit Systems.

History
Leichhardt Tram Depot was built as a twelve road depot on the corner of William Street and Derbyshire Road, Leichhardt, being available for use on 22 June 1915. It was never used as an operational tram depot, instead being used to store trams.

It was converted to a bus depot in 1937. It was also the central maintenance facility until the Chullora Bus Workshops opened in 1958.  The old tramshed  is used as part of the new expanded Leichhardt Bus Depot while the Sydney Bus Museum occupies the northern bays after its relocation from Tempe Bus Depot. Both the former Cable Stores Building  and Traffic Office  (also known as the Tram Depot 
Office) was proposed as part of the cancelled Leichhardt Police Station development.

The depot is also home to the Roads & Maritime Services barrier transfer machine that moves the central barrier on Victoria Road between the Gladesville and Iron Cove Bridges.

As part of the contracting out of region 6, operation of Leichhardt depot passed from State Transit to Transit Systems on 1 July 2018.

As of November 2022, it has an allocation of 237 buses.

Design
As a tram depot, its design had some unique features such as the roller doors, and ancillary store and workshop buildings plus:

12 tracks
Decorative front parapet
Brick panelled side walls
Saw-tooth Roof orientation to south

Gallery

References

External links

Service NSW

Bus garages
Industrial buildings in Sydney
Tram depots in Sydney
Transport infrastructure completed in 1915
1915 establishments in Australia